Carlos Cisneros may refer to:

 Carlos Cisneros (basketball) (born 1933), Argentine basketball player
 Carlos Cisneros (politician) (1948–2019), American politician
 Carlos Cisneros (footballer) (born 1993), Mexican footballer